This is the list of waterways and maritime features in Singapore:

Basins
Benoi Basin
Gul Basin
Jurong Basin
Kallang Basin
Northern Tuas Basin
Southern Tuas Basin
Store Basin
Telok Ayer Basin (now Shenton Way)

Bays
Cruise Bay
Marina Bay

Channels
Fairburn Channel
Keppel Channel
Ketam Channel
Nenas Channel
Sebarok Channel
East Jurong Channel
West Jurong Channel

Docks
Dock Number 1
Dock Number 2
King George VI Dock
King's Dock
Queen's Dock

Waterways
Jong Waterway
Sinki Fairway
Sisters Fairway
Temasek Fairway
East Keppel Fairway
West Keppel Fairway
Southern Fairway
Eastern Corridor Fairway
 Eastern Fairway

Harbours
Keppel Harbour
Serangoon Harbour

Lakes
See Lakes of Singapore

Reservoirs
See Reservoirs in Singapore

Rivers
See List of rivers in Singapore

Seas
South China Sea

Straits
Selat Ayer Merbau
Selat Banyan
Selat Berkas
Selat Biola
Selat Bukom
Selat Pandan
Selat Pauh
Selat Pawai
Selat Pesek
Selat Pulau Damar
Selat Johor (Straits of Johor)
Selat Jurong
Selat Sakra
Selat Salu
Selat Samulun
Selat Sengkir
Selat Sinki
Selat Sudong
Selat Tanjong Hakim
Straits of Singapore (Selat Singapura)

References